Marcos Gullón Ferrera (born 20 February 1989) is a Spanish professional footballer who plays as a midfielder.

Club career
Born in Madrid, Gullón started his career with Villarreal CF, going on to represent both reserve teams in his beginnings as a senior. In the 2008–09 season, whilst with the B side, he contributed 36 games – play-offs included – as they promoted to Segunda División for the first time ever.

Gullón continued to be first choice for the B's in the following years. His competitive input with the main squad, however, consisted of six matches, the first occurring on 29 October 2009 in a 1–1 away draw against CD Puertollano in the round of 32 of the Copa del Rey. His maiden appearance in La Liga took place ten days later, as he came on as an 87th-minute substitute in the 3–2 loss at Sevilla FC.

In 2011–12, Gullón experienced three relegations as both Villarreal A and B dropped down a level – in the latter case, in spite of ranking in 12th position in the second tier. He signed for top-flight club Racing de Santander in January 2012, and they finished dead last.

After another drop with the Cantabrians, Gullón spent the following two and a half seasons in the Cypriot First Division with Apollon Limassol FC, scoring four goals from 31 appearances in his first to help his team to the third place. In 2016, in another winter transfer window move, he joined Roda JC Kerkrade from the Dutch Eredivisie.

International career
Four youth categories comprised, Gullón earned 24 caps for Spain. The first of three for the under-21 side came on 4 September 2009, as he featured the full 90 minutes in a 2–0 win over Poland for the 2011 UEFA European Championship qualifiers at the Estadio Carlos Tartiere, providing the assist for Joselu's goal.

Club statistics

Honours
Fuenlabrada
Segunda División B: 2018–19

Spain U20
Mediterranean Games: 2009

References

External links

1989 births
Living people
Spanish footballers
Footballers from Madrid
Association football midfielders
La Liga players
Segunda División players
Segunda División B players
Tercera División players
Villarreal CF C players
Villarreal CF B players
Villarreal CF players
Racing de Santander players
CF Fuenlabrada footballers
UD San Sebastián de los Reyes players
Las Rozas CF players
Cypriot First Division players
Apollon Limassol FC players
Eredivisie players
Roda JC Kerkrade players
Spain youth international footballers
Spain under-21 international footballers
Competitors at the 2009 Mediterranean Games
Mediterranean Games medalists in football
Mediterranean Games gold medalists for Spain
Spanish expatriate footballers
Expatriate footballers in Cyprus
Expatriate footballers in the Netherlands
Spanish expatriate sportspeople in Cyprus
Spanish expatriate sportspeople in the Netherlands